Kamakhya–Anand Vihar Weekly Express is an Express train of the Indian Railways connecting  in Delhi and   in Assam. It is currently being operated with 15621/15622 train numbers on once in week basis.

Service

The 15621/Kamakhya–Anand Vihar Weekly Express has an average speed of 53 km/hr and covers 1878 km in 36 hrs 5 mins. 15622/Anand Vihar–Kamakhya Weekly Express has an average speed of 48 km/hr and covers  1878 km in 39 hrs 40 mins.

Route and halts 

The important halts of the train are:

Assam:
  (Starts)
 Goalpara Town
 
 

West Bengal:
 
 Binnaguri Junction
 New Jalpaiguri (Siliguri)

Bihar:
 
 
 
 

Uttar Pradesh :
 
 
 
 
 
 
 
 

Delhi:
  (Ends)

Schedule

Rake sharing
15619/15620 – Kamakhya–Gaya Weekly Express

Traction

Rake maintenance 

The train is maintained by the Guwahati Coaching Depot. The same rake is used for Kamakhya–Gaya Weekly Express for one way which is altered by the second rake on the other way.

Coach composition

The train consists of 24 LHB coach:

 1 AC III Tier
 6 Sleeper coaches
 7 General
 2 Second-class Luggage/parcel van

References

External links 

 15621/Kamakhya-Anand Vihar Terminal Weekly Express India Rail Info
 15622/Anand Vihar Terminal-Kamakhya Weekly Express India Rail Info

Transport in Guwahati
Transport in Delhi
Railway services introduced in 2013
Rail transport in Assam
Rail transport in West Bengal
Rail transport in Bihar
Rail transport in Uttar Pradesh
Rail transport in Delhi
Express trains in India